The Pastor's Wife may refer to:
 The Pastor's Wife (book), a true crime book by Diane Fanning
 The Pastor's Wife (film), a 2011 biographical television film based on the book